Typhoon Chaba, known in the Philippines as Typhoon Katring, was the first typhoon to impact Japan since Typhoon Melor in October 2009. Chaba means Hibiscus in Thai.

Meteorological history

Early on 20 October, the Japan Meteorological Agency (JMA) upgraded an area of low pressure into a tropical depression. Later that day, the JMA reported that the tropical depression slightly intensified. The next day, the Joint Typhoon Warning Center started monitoring the system as tropical depression 16W. On 23 October, the system entered the Philippine Area of responsibility and the Philippine Atmospheric, Geophysical and Astronomical Services Administration (PAGASA) started monitoring the system as Tropical Depression "Katring" On 24 October, the JMA and JTWC upgraded the tropical depression into a tropical storm and the JMA named it "Chaba". On 25 October, the JMA further upgraded the storm into a Severe Tropical Storm. Later that day, the JTWC upgraded the storm into a Category 1 Typhoon. Early on 26 October, the JMA further upgraded the storm into a Typhoon. Early on 27 October, the JTWC upgraded the typhoon into a Category 2 Typhoon. Later that day, the JTWC further upgraded the typhoon into a Category 3 Typhoon. The following day JTWC upgraded the system into a Category 4 Typhon. Later that day, the JTWC downgraded Chaba into a Category 3 Typhoon. Early on 29 October, the JTWC further downgraded Chaba into a Category 2 Typhoon, while the JTWC downgraded it into a Category 1 Typhoon. Early on 30 October, the JTWC reported that Chaba had transitioned into an extratropical cyclone. During the afternoon of 30 October, the JMA downgraded Chaba to a remnant low as passed near Japan. The remnants of Chaba continued to weaken as it moved northeast, but strengthened again in approaching the Gulf of Alaska into a major storm with 55-knot winds, kicking up 40–50-foot waves, with pressure as low as 939 mb. The storm's center came ashore in the vicinity of Cordova, Alaska on 1 November, but not before pulling an atmospheric river of moisture into the American Pacific Northwest, setting a record for that date of precipitation in Seattle.

Preparations and impact

In preparation for Chaba, more than 160 flights were cancelled. Islanders in southern Japan
started sandbagging doors and reinforcing windows as Chaba churned closer. Strong winds and heavy rains lashed through Okinawa and there were a lot of concerns about the island of Amami which was in the typhoon's path. Over 257 residents were evacuated from the Amami Islands to higher grounds, schools and town halls which were converted into evacuation centers. Late on 29 October, Chaba approached Amami island region in Kagoshima. Strong winds injured five people and felled electric poles cutting electricity supply. Landfall was predicted on the main island of Honshu.

Five people were also injured across the island. Races in Tokyo were postponed by the Japan Racing Association until 1 November because of the typhoon.

Retirement and naming issues
The name Katring has been used several times by PAGASA, but after 2010 the name Katring was decommissioned from the rotating lists, possibly due to two storms of the same name that caused damage and destruction in parts of Luzon in 1987 and 1994. It was eventually replaced by the name Kanor, which drew controversy as it is coincidentally the name of a person who was involved in a sex scandal that went viral just a few years prior. PAGASA later changed Kanor to Karding in September 2014.

See also
Typhoon Neoguri (2014)
Typhoon Jangmi (2008)
Typhoon Nuri (2014)

References

External links

JMA General Information of Typhoon Chaba (1014) from Digital Typhoon
The JMA's Best Track Data on Typhoon Chaba (1014) 
The JMA's RSMC Best Track Data (Graphics) on Typhoon Chaba (1014)
The JMA's RSMC Best Track Data (Text)
The JTWC's Best Track Data on Typhoon 16W (Chaba)
16W.CHABA from the U.S. Naval Research Laboratory

2010 Pacific typhoon season
Typhoons
Typhoons in Japan
Chaba